Katherine Beers (born December 30, 1982) is an American woman who was kidnapped when she was 9 years old in Bay Shore, New York by John Esposito, a friend of the family, and held in an underground bunker from December 28, 1992, to January 13, 1993.

Background
Katie Beers lived with her mother Marilyn Beers and older half-brother John Beers in Long Island, New York. Her biological father has never been identified as her conception resulted from a one-night stand. From a young age, Katie also lived with her godmother Linda Inghilleri and Inghilleri's husband, Salvatore. Marilyn frequently neglected Katie and John, leaving them in the care of the Inghilleris, from whom they would endure abuse including frequent sexual assaults by Sal.

John Esposito was a friend of the Beers family who would frequently give attention and gifts to Katie and John Beers, but would also sexually abuse John. Esposito had previously been arrested in 1977 for the attempted abduction of a twelve-year-old boy.

Kidnapping
Beers was lured into Esposito's house at Bay Shore, New York on December 28, 1992, two days before her 10th birthday, by the promise of birthday presents. After Beers played a video game in Esposito's bedroom, he forced her into an underground concrete bunker.

The 6-foot-by-7-foot bunker hill was located under Esposito's garden and accessed via a six-foot long tunnel. The entrance tunnel was concealed by a 200-pound concrete trap door and hidden behind a removable bookcase in Esposito's office. The bunker contained a commode toilet and closed-circuit television system. Within the bunker was a coffin-size soundproofed room containing a bed and television where Beers was chained. Esposito would later tell police he had built the bunker specifically for Beers. Beers herself later recalled playing in the dirt displaced by the bunker as Esposito dug it a few years before the kidnapping.

Immediately after forcing Beers into the bunker, Esposito made her record a message where she claimed a man with a knife had taken her. Esposito played the message at a pay phone outside the Spaceplex amusement arcade at Nesconset, New York and told the arcade's staff that he had lost Beers within the building. Police were called when she couldn't be located.

During her captivity, Esposito would frequently visit Beers to sexually abuse her while also providing food, blankets and toys. He allowed Beers into the larger part of the bunker when he visited her but would force her back into the smaller room when she was alone, although Beers was able to unchain herself and escape to the larger room in Esposito's absence after hiding a key under her pillow, but was unable to escape the bunker itself. Esposito told Beers he intended to keep her in the bunker for the remainder of her life, and planned to take a photo of her asleep and send it to police so they would believe she was dead, although the photo was never taken.

Esposito was a suspect from an early stage in the police investigation, following accusations of previous sexual abuse towards John Beers and witnesses at Spaceplex stating that he entered the arcade alone on the day of Beers' disappearance. Police also determined that Beers' phone message about a man with a knife was from a previously made recording based on a lack of background noise.

On January 13, 1993, 17 days after the kidnapping, Esposito confessed to holding Beers captive and took police to the bunker where they rescued her.

Aftermath
Esposito pleaded guilty to kidnapping on June 16, 1994 and was sentenced on July 27, 1994 to 15 years to life, a sentence he served at Sing Sing prison in Westchester County, New York. During Esposito's trial, Beers said he had raped her during her captivity. Although he was not charged with this, the judge sentencing him agreed with her. Esposito was found dead in his cell of apparently natural causes on September 4, 2013, shortly after his fourth parole hearing in 20 years.

Sal Inghilleri was convicted of two counts of sexual abuse and served 12 years for molesting Beers. During the investigation into the kidnapping, authorities discovered that Inghilleri had sexually abused the girl before she was abducted. He was prosecuted additionally for those crimes. He died in prison in 2009.

Shortly after her rescue, Beers was sent to live with foster parents in East Hampton, New York due to the neglect and abuse the two children had experienced before the kidnapping. Beers was provided with anonymity and raised by her foster parents until adulthood. In January 2013, Beers spoke publicly for the first time about her ordeal and revealed that she was now married with two children and working in insurance. During the same month, she published a memoir about her ordeal.

Media
In the months following the kidnapping, two books covering the case were published: My Name Is Katherine: The True Story of Little Katie Beers written by Maria Eftimiades and Joe Treen, and 17 Days: The Katie Beers Story by Arthur Herzog.

Beers' memoir, Buried Memories (known as Help Me in the United Kingdom) was co-written by reporter Carolyn Gusoff, who had covered Beers' case as it was happening, and was published on January 13, 2013, on the 20th anniversary of her rescue.

ABC's 20/20 episode "Saved" covered the Katie Beers story in February 2013.

Investigation Discovery recounted the case on an episode of its 2020 documentary miniseries Killer Carnies. It included accounts from Beers, the lead police detective, and others.

See also
List of kidnappings
List of solved missing persons cases

External links
 "Buried Memories: A Vulnerable Girl and Her Story of Survival" at Amazon.
 Reddit Ask Me Anything (AMA) page, January 2018 - Katie Beers

Further reading

References

1982 births
1990s missing person cases
1992 crimes in the United States
1992 in New York (state)
Crimes in New York (state)
Crimes on Long Island, New York
December 1992 crimes
December 1992 events in the United States
Formerly missing people
Kidnappings in the United States
Kidnapped American children
Living people
Missing person cases in New York (state)
Islip (town), New York
Incidents of violence against girls